Rumex sanguineus, commonly known as wood dock, bloody dock or red-veined dock, is a perennial flowering plant species in the family Polygonaceae. Rumex sanguineus is a dicot and can be observed in Europe with at least two varieties.

Description
The leaves are situated to the base of the plant only. They are deciduous to partially persistent at maturity. The blade of the leaf is lance shaped with a more or less pointed base at the end and on average measure 10–30 × 2.5–6 cm.
Rumex sanguineus flowers in the summer in moist and riparian habitat. Flower is terminal and occupies the top 2/3 of the stem. Inflorescence is lax, interrupted, broadly paniculate. The pedicel, stalk bearing the inflorescence, is proximal 1/3 and rarely in the middle of the filiform. In general, it is larger than the inner tepals with distinctly swollen articulation. When flowering there are normally ten to twenty flowers in each well-spaced whorl. Achenes are dark reddish brown to almost black.

It is differentiated from the very similar Rumex conglomeratus by a more slender and erect habitus.

Distribution
Rumex sanguineus is commonly found in most of Europe south of about 60 degrees north, though not in Russia and rarely in the mediterranean. It inhabits damp, shady places, especially in woodland. It is a crop-weed that can be found on less arable fields on the outskirt vegetation surrounding arable fields.
Rumex sanguineus is not native to North America with most reports of Rumex sanguineus being confused with R. conglomeratus or immature R. obtusifolius.

Use
The wood dock is edible. However, as it contains antinutritive and harmful oxalic acid and its salts (oxalates), it is slightly poisonous and should therefore not be eaten in large quantities. (The contents are lower than in the related and better-known sorrel.) It is both used as a wild vegetable and cultivated, with plants and seeds being commercially available. It contains considerable amounts of vitamin C and carotene. Normally the (preferably young) leaves are eaten, for example in salads. However, related species such as garden sorrel and French sorrel are generally preferred when it comes to vegetable use. In comparison, the wood dock is said to have less taste and more ornamental values. Since mainly the leaves are valued, the less conspicuous inflorescences are often removed early on to promote stronger and bushier leaf growth and also to prevent (possibly heavy) uncontrolled spreading.

References

External links
 
 
 

sanguineus
Flora of Malta